Protektorfjellet is a mountain in Oscar II Land at Spitsbergen, Svalbard. It has a height of 847 meter, and is located west of the bay Trygghamna at the northern side of Isfjorden.

References

Mountains of Spitsbergen